The Rio Receiver was a home stereo device for playing MP3 files stored on your computer's hard drive over an Ethernet or HomePNA network. It was later rebranded and sold as the Dell Digital Audio Receiver.

With a design derived from the existing Linux-based Empeg Car, it became popular among the Linux hacking community.

The hardware consisted of a Cirrus Logic 7212 CPU (ARM720T at 74 MHz), 1Mx32 (4 MB) of EDO RAM, and either 512k×16 or 256k×16 (1 MB or 0.5 MB) of NOR flash used to boot. Audio output used a Burr-Brown PCM1716 DAC that drove line outputs, the headphone jack, and a Tripath class-D digital audio amplifier for speakers. Network connections were via either a Cirrus logic 8900A (10MBit Ethernet) or a Broadcom HomePNA 10 Mbit/s chipset; if no Ethernet link was seen at boot time, the unit tried HomePNA. The user interface was a 128x64 pixel monochrome LCD with an EL backlight, a rotary control with a push button, several buttons and IR remote control.

The unit booted via a 2.2 linux kernel in flash which used DHCP and SSDP to discover an NFS server from which it loaded a new kernel.  The second kernel then mounted a root filesystem over NFS containing a small set of standard POSIX tools and an application for selecting and playing music over the network, which was served using HTTP by the Audio Receiver Manager software running on a Windows PC.  Although the music player and the Audio Receiver Manager and Broadcom HomePNA kernel driver module were proprietary software, the kernel and other tools were open source.  The two-step kernel boot process allowed rapid development of changes to the kernel allowing units to run new kernels by simply power cycling them; the use of standard protocols meant a variety of replacement software components could be developed independently.

External links
 RRR Project - Replacement Client Application by Reza Naima
 RioPlay - Open source project to replace the client and server side software
 SlimRio - Open source client software to interoperate with SlimServer.
 Jreceiver - Open source host software to interoperate with various client modules for the rio receiver.
 MediaNet - Replacement client and server side software with FLAC, OGG and shoutcast support.
 YARRS - Yet Another Rio Receiver Server. Unix-based, free-software replacement server.

 
Linux-based devices